The Midway Subdivision Historic District, also known as Midway Groves, is a U.S. historic district (designated as such on May 29, 1998) located in Manatee County, Florida a short distance north of the Manatee-Sarasota county line. It has the post office address of 7201 15th Street East in Sarasota. It contains 4 historic buildings.

References

External links
 Manatee County listings at National Register of Historic Places

Buildings and structures in Sarasota, Florida
National Register of Historic Places in Manatee County, Florida
Historic districts on the National Register of Historic Places in Florida